Kanaka is a former Indian actress.

Personal life
Kanaka is the daughter of Tamil actress Devika. She is also the great-granddaughter of Telugu cinema's first sound film's producer Raghupathi Venkaiah Naidu.

Career

She started her career as a heroine in the Tamil movie Karagatakaran, directed by Gangai Amaran, a  blockbuster movie which ran more than a year. Kanaka acted in many Tamil movies, including Periya Veetu Pannakkaran (1990), Athisaya Piravi (1990), Samundi (1992), Periya Kudumbam (1995) and  Viralukketha Veekkam (1999).  She also starred in a few Telugu and Malayalam movies with major stars like Mukesh, Mammootty and Mohanlal. She has acted in more than 50 films in Tamil, Malayalam  and Telugu in a span of 10 years. Her last Tamil film was Sillunu Oru Kaadhal (2006).

Filmography

References

External links 
 

Actresses in Malayalam cinema
Living people
Actresses in Tamil cinema
Indian film actresses
Actresses from Chennai
20th-century Indian actresses
Actresses in Telugu cinema
21st-century Indian actresses
1973 births